Raphael Rodrigues Borges (born 19 January 1999) is a Brazilian footballer who plays as a central defender for Avaí.

Club career
Born in Água Boa, Mato Grosso, Raphael Rodrigues began his career with Luverdense, making his first team debut in the 2016 Copa FMF. In 2018, he was loaned to Cuiabá and returned to youth football.

Back to Luverdense in 2019, Raphael Rodrigues featured sparingly before moving to Barra-SC on 24 September 2020, on loan. He returned to his parent club ahead of the 2021 season, but left for Hercílio Luz on 18 August of that year.

On 15 December 2021, Raphael Rodrigues agreed to a deal with Comercial-SP, but the move never materialized, and he joined Confiança instead the following 9 January. A regular starter for the latter, he was loaned to Série A side Avaí on 14 August 2022, until December.

Raphael Rodrigues made his top tier debut on 9 October 2022, starting in a 2–0 away loss against Fortaleza.

Career statistics

Honours
Luverdense
Copa Verde: 2017
Copa FMF: 2019

References

External links
Avaí profile 

1999 births
Living people
Brazilian footballers
Sportspeople from Mato Grosso
Association football defenders
Campeonato Brasileiro Série A players
Campeonato Brasileiro Série B players
Campeonato Brasileiro Série C players
Luverdense Esporte Clube players
Barra Futebol Clube players
Hercílio Luz Futebol Clube players
Associação Desportiva Confiança players
Avaí FC players